Vagner da Silva Sarti (born January 9, 1978) is a former Brazilian football player.

Playing career
In 2001, Vagner joined Japanese J2 League club Ventforet Kofu which finished at the bottom place for 2 years in a row (1999-2000). He debuted in J2 against Shonan Bellmare on March 17. However he could only play 3 match as midfielder and left Ventforet in June.

Club statistics

References

External links

1978 births
Living people
Brazilian footballers
Brazilian expatriate footballers
Expatriate footballers in Japan
J2 League players
Ventforet Kofu players
Association football midfielders